Mediorhodacarus is a genus of mites in the family Rhodacaridae. There is a single species in this genus, Mediorhodacarus tetranodulosus.

References

Rhodacaridae